Jean-Philippe Salabreuil (25 May 1940 in Neuilly-sur-Seine – 27 February 1970 in Paris), real name Jean-Pierre Steinbach, was a French poet. His first book, La Liberté des feuilles, received awards in the name of Félix Fénéon and Max Jacob. He often wrote poems in prose. He died at the age of 29; it is possible that he committed suicide.

Books 
 La Liberté des feuilles, Gallimard, (1964)
 Juste retour d'abîme, Gallimard,  (1965) 
 L'Inespéré, Gallimard, (1969)

External links 
 Présentation et choix de poèmes, in French

1940 births
1970 deaths
Poètes maudits
20th-century French poets
French male poets
Prix Fénéon winners
20th-century French male writers
1970 suicides
Suicides in France